The National Congress of the Canaries (CNC) is a separatist political party in the Canary Islands, Spain.

Ideology and goals
CNC supports independence for the Canary Islands. The CNC was founded in 1986 by Antonio Cubillo, former general secretary of MPAIAC, after Cubillo returned from Algiers, where he lived. The CNC's symbol consists of Berber letter "Z", reflecting Antonio Cubillo's policy of "reverting to Berber roots." However, as the polls show, few Canarians support the history of violent actions of Antonio Cubillo's movement.

History
The CNC achieved representation in a municipal council of the Canary Islands only once, in the 1987 elections. It won 819 votes (6.47%) in the municipality of Arrecife (Lanzarote) and won one seat. In 1991, the CNC made a coalition with FREPIC-AWAÑAK under the name "Coalición Canarias por la Independencia". However, the CNC obtained fewer votes than when it had gone to the elections on its own. Presently it does not take part in the electoral process of the Canary Islands and it shows few signs of political activity.

The youth wing of the National Congress of the Canaries became the group that is today known as Azarug. In 1992 Azarug split from the CNC party and initiated its own course. Finally in January 2009 the National Congress of the Canaries formed a new youth section under the name Juventudes del Congreso Nacional de Canarias (JCNC).

See also
Canarian nationalism
List of active separatist movements in Africa

References

External links
 CNC website

Political parties in the Canary Islands
Canarian nationalist parties
National liberation movements
Pro-independence parties
Ahora Repúblicas